Chelva is an old variety of white wine grape originating in Extremadura, Spain. In 2015 there were 5,730 ha (14,159 acres) of Chelva vineyards in Spain, almost all of which were in Extremadura.

Synonyms
Chelva is also known under the synonyms Chelva de Cebreros, Chelva de Guareña, Eva, Forastera Blanca, Gabriela (Pajarete and Arcos), Guarena, Mantúo, Mantúo de Pilas, Montúa, Montúo de Villanueva, Montúo Gordo, Uva Rey or Uva del Rey, Uva de Puerto Real, Villanueva.

References

Spanish wine
Grape varieties of Spain
White wine grape varieties